Hindus (foaled 1897 in Kentucky) was an American Thoroughbred racehorse best known for winning the 1900 Preakness Stakes. Bred and raced by George J. Long, he was sired by Volante, winner of the 1885 American Derby. Hindus was out of the mare Ignite, a daughter of Woodlands.

Racing career 
Racing at age two, Hindus ran third to winner Gulden in the 1899 Sapphire Stakes at Sheepshead Bay Race Track.

In his three-year-old season Hindus finished second to Sarmatian in the Broadway Stakes at Gravesend Race Track. He finished seventh in the 1900 Kentucky Derby won by Lieut. Gibson.

Preakness Stakes 
The twenty-fifth running of the Preakness Stakes took place on Tuesday, May 29, 1900 at Gravesend Race Track on Coney Island, New York. On that day Hindus went off as the longest shot on the board at odds of 15-1 in the field of ten stakes winning colts. In that race he broke well with a good start in fourth place under Canadian-born jockey Henry Spencer. Rounding the first turn Hindus dropped back to next to last in eighth place under a strong hold by Spencer. As the race progressed, Hindus laid back in waiting down the entire back stretch and around the final turn. Near the top of the lane Hindus began a big rush and passed all rivals in the last one sixteenth of a mile.  In the end Hindus prevailed at the wire by a short head over runner-up Sarmatian. Listed at 6-1 odds, Sarmatian outdistanced third-place finisher Ten Candles by three full lengths. The final time for the one mile and one sixteenth race on dirt was 1:48 2/5 over a fast track. Hindus won almost 70% of the total purse of $2,500 netting $1,900.

Breeding

Hindus was inbred 4 × 4 to the stallion Lexington, meaning the horse appears in the pedigree twice in the fourth generation.

See also
 Buddhist (horse)

References

1897 racehorse births
Racehorses bred in Kentucky
Racehorses trained in the United States
Preakness Stakes winners
Thoroughbred family 5-g
Byerley Turk sire line